Monflanquin (Languedocien: Montflanquin) is a commune in the Lot-et-Garonne department in south-western France. Built in 1256 as a military bastide town on a strategic north-south route, it changed hands several times during the Hundred Years' War.

The village is a member of the Les Plus Beaux Villages de France ("The most beautiful villages of France") association.

Demography

Notable people 
Louis Couffignal (1902-1966), mathematician and cybernetics pioneer

See also
Communes of the Lot-et-Garonne department

References

External links

Monflanquin bastide modèle - Georges Odo

Communes of Lot-et-Garonne
Plus Beaux Villages de France